Wollongong is an electoral district of the Legislative Assembly in the Australian state of New South Wales. It is represented by Paul Scully of the Labor Party. Since a redistribution in 2013, it has covered an area of 79.25 square kilometres and includes the localities of Berkeley, Coachwood Park, Coniston, Cordeaux Heights, Corrimal, Cringila, Fairy Meadow, Farmborough Chase, Farmborough Heights, Figtree, Gwynneville, Kembla Grange, Kembla Heights, Kemblawarra, Lake Heights, Lindsay Heights, Mangerton, Mount Kembla, Mount Saint Thomas, North Wollongong, Port Kembla, Primbee, Spring Hill, Towradgi, Unanderra, Warrawong, West Wollongong, Windang, Wollongong.

In August 2016, Noreen Hay resigned from the Legislative Assembly triggering a third by-election to be held on 12 November 2016, the other two being Canterbury and Orange. Scully won the by-election, retaining the seat for the Labor party.

History
Wollongong was created in 1904, replacing parts of Woronora and Illawarra. In 1920, with the introduction of proportional representation, it was absorbed into Wollondilly, along with Allowrie. In 1927, with the abolition of proportional representation, it was recreated, along with a new Illawarra electorate. In 1930, it was replaced by Bulli. In 1941, a new electorate of Wollongong-Kembla was created. This was split into Wollongong and Kembla in 1968. Wollongong has rarely been won by the right wing  party and in recent decades has become one of Labor's safest seats.

Members for Wollongong

Election results

References

Wollongong
Wollongong
1904 establishments in Australia
Wollongong
1920 disestablishments in Australia
Wollongong
1927 establishments in Australia
Wollongong
1930 disestablishments in Australia
Wollongong
1968 establishments in Australia